This is a list of the National Register of Historic Places listings in Bremer County, Iowa.

This is intended to be a complete list of the properties and districts on the National Register of Historic Places in Bremer County, Iowa, United States. Latitude and longitude coordinates are provided for many National Register properties and districts; these locations may be seen together in a map.

There are 12 properties and districts listed on the National Register in the county.

Current listings

|}

Former listings

|}

See also

 List of National Historic Landmarks in Iowa
 National Register of Historic Places listings in Iowa
 Listings in neighboring counties: Black Hawk, Buchanan, Butler, Chickasaw, Fayette, Floyd

References

Bremer